Phobia is a 1980 Canadian horror-thriller film, directed by John Huston and starring Paul Michael Glaser.

Plot summary 
Dr. Peter Ross (Paul Michael Glaser), a psychiatrist, introduces a radical new therapy which he tests on five of his patients to cure them of their various fears (heights, crowded places, enclosed spaces, men and snakes). However his patients start being murdered by an unknown assailant using methods relating to their respective fears.

Cast 
Paul Michael Glaser as Dr. Peter Ross 
Susan Hogan as Jenny St. Clair
John Colicos as Inspector Larry Barnes
David Bolt as Henry Owen
Patricia Collins as Dr. Alice Toland
David Eisner as Johnny Venuti
Lisa Langlois as Laura Adams
Alexandra Stewart as Barbara Grey
Robert O'Ree as Bubba King
Neil Vipond as Dr. Clegg
Marian Waldman as Mrs. Casey
Kenneth Welsh as Sgt Joe Wheeler

Reception
Los Angeles Times film critic Kevin Thomas described Phobia as "the worst film ever directed by a winner of the American Film Institute's Life Achievement Award."

Reginald H. Morris received a Genie Award nomination for Best Cinematography at the 2nd Genie Awards in 1981.

References

External links 
 
 
 

1980 films
Films directed by John Huston
English-language Canadian films
1980 horror films
1980s horror thriller films
Canadian horror thriller films
Medical-themed films
Paramount Pictures films
Films with screenplays by Peter Bellwood
Films about fear
Films with screenplays by Jimmy Sangster
Films with screenplays by Ronald Shusett
Films with screenplays by Dan O'Bannon
1980s English-language films
1980s Canadian films